This is a complete list of Catholic Churches in Hong Kong.

Hong Kong Island 

Cathedral of the Immaculate Conception, (Mid-Levels)
Immaculate Heart of Mary Chapel (Central)
Holy Cross Church (Shau Kei Wan)
Salesian Mass Centre (Chai Wan Road)
Tai Koo Shing Mass Centre (Taikoo Shing)
Our Lady of Lourdes Church (Pok Fu Lam)
Wah Fu Estate Mass Centre (Wah Fu Estate)
Our Lady of Mount Carmel Church (Wan Chai)
Our Lady of the Rosary Church (Kennedy Town)
Star of the Sea Church (Chai Wan)
St. Anne's Church (Stanley), stannes.hk
St. Anthony's Church (Pok Fu Lam Road)
Our Lady Seat of Wisdom Chapel (Pok Fu Lam Road)
St. Joseph's Church (Mid-Levels)
St. Jude's Church (North Point)
Quarry Bay Mass Centre (Quarry Bay)
Transfiguration Chapel (North Point)
St. Margaret Mary's Church (Happy Valley)
Christ the King Chapel (Causeway Bay)
Rosaryhill School Chapel (Stubbs Road)
Wah Yan College Chapel (Queen's Road East)
St. Peter's Church (Aberdeen)

Kowloon and New Kowloon

Christ the Worker Mass Centre (Ngau Tau Kok)
Holy Family Mass Centre (Choi Hung Estate)
St. Francis Xavier Chapel (Choi Wan Estate)
Mary Help of Christians Church (Ma Tau Wai)
Holy Spirit Mass Centre (Ho Man Tin)
Ling To Mass Centre (Ho Man Tin)
Mother of Good Counsel Church (San Po Kong)
St. Vincent's Chapel (Wong Tai Sin)
Notre Dame Chapel (Ma Tau Wai)
St. Eugene de Mazenod Mass Centre (To Kwa Wan)
Our Lady of China Church (Tai Kok Tsui)
Our Lady Queen of Angels Mass Centre (Shun Lee Estate)
Resurrection Church (Kwun Tong)
Immaculate Heart of Mary Mass Centre (Po Tat Estate)
Rosary Church (Tsim Sha Tsui)
Holy Family Chapel (Tsim Sha Tsui)
St. Peter's Church (Tsim Sha Tsui)
St. Andrew's Church (Tseung Kwan O)
St. Bonaventure Church (Tsz Wan Shan)
St. Edward's Mass Centre (Lam Tin)
St. Francis of Assisi Church (Sham Shui Po)
St. Ignatius Chapel (Yau Ma Tei)
Diocesan Pastoral Centre for the Disabled (Ho Man Tin)
St. James' Church (Yau Tong)
St. John the Baptist Mass Centre (Kwun Tong)
St. Joseph's Church (Kowloon Bay)
St. Lawrence's Church (Cheung Sha Wan)
Delia Memorial School Mass Centre (Mei Foo)
St. Mary's Church (Hung Hom)
St. Patrick's Mass Centre (Wang Tau Hom)
St. Paul's Mass Centre (Yau Ma Tei)
St. Teresa's Church (Kowloon Tong)
St. Joseph's Chapel (Kowloon Tong)
St. Vincent's Church (Hang Hau)

New Territories

Our Lady of Fatima Church (Cheung Chau)
Our Lady of Lourdes Chapel (Lamma Island)
Annunciation Church (Tsuen Wan)
Holy Redeemer Church (Tuen Mun)
Immaculate Heart of Mary Church (Tai Po)
Saint Zhang Dapeng Chapel (Tai Po)
Saint Anna Wang Mass Centre (Tai Po)
Epiphany of Our Lord Chapel (Sham Chung)
Holy Family Chapel (Chek Keng)
Immaculate Conception Chapel (Tai Long Village)
Mother of Christ Church (Sheung Shui)
Sacred Heart Church (Sai Kung)
Immaculate Conception Chapel (Wo Mei, Sai Kung)
St. Joseph's Chapel (Yim Tin Tsai, Sai Kung)
Star of the Sea Mass Centre (Sai Wan, Sai Kung)
SS. Cosmas and Damian Church (Tsuen Wan)
SS. Peter and Paul Church (Yuen Long)
St. Jude's Mass Centre (Kam Tin)
St. Alfred's Church (Sha Tin)
St. Benedict Church (Sha Tin), 
Adam Schall Residence Mass Centre (Sha Tin)
Martyr Saints of China Mass Centre (Wo Che Estate)
St. Francis Church (Ma On Shan)
St. Jerome's Church (Tin Shui Wai)
Rosary Chapel (Yuen Long)
St. John the Apostle Mass Centre (Sheung Kwai Chung)
Shek Lei Pui Mass Centre (Shek Lei Estate)
St. Joseph's Church (Fanling)
St. Matthew the Apostle Mass Centre (Butterfly Estate, Tuen Mun)
St. Stephen's Church (Ha Kwai Chung)
Saint Wu Guosheng Chapel (Cho Yiu Chuen)
St. Thomas the Apostle Church (Tsing Yi)
Epiphany Parish (Lantau)
Epiphany Church (Mui Wo)
Our Lady Queen of Peace Chapel (Peng Chau)
Our Lady of Perpetual Help Chapel (Tai O)
Trinity Chapel (Discovery Bay)
Our Lady of Visitation Chapel (Tung Chung)

See also
 Roman Catholic Diocese of Hong Kong
 Catholic Church in Hong Kong
 Places of worship in Hong Kong
 Historic churches of Sai Kung Peninsula

External links

 List of churches on the Roman Catholic Diocese of Hong Kong website

 
Hong Kong religion-related lists
Hong Kong
Churches, Catholic, Hong Kong